The 1993 Fordham Rams football team was an American football team that represented Fordham University during the 1993 NCAA Division I-AA football season. For the fourth straight year, Fordham finished last in the Patriot League. 

In their eighth and final year under head coach Larry Glueck, the Rams compiled a 1–10 record. Mike Costanzo and John Strauss were the team captains.

The Rams were outscored 315 to 145. Their 1–4 conference record placed last in the six-team Patriot League standings. 

Fordham played its home games at Jack Coffey Field on the university's Rose Hill campus in The Bronx, in New York City.

Schedule

References

Fordham
Fordham Rams football seasons
Fordham Rams football